Huddersfield Town's 1915–16 campaign saw Town play in the wartime football league, following the outbreak of World War I. Town played in the Midland League and finished in 3rd place, as well as 3rd place in the Subsidiary Competition North Division.

Results

Midland Division

Subsidiary Competition Northern Division

Huddersfield Town A.F.C. seasons
Huddersfield Town F.C.